This list of traffic collisions records serious road crashes: those that have a large death toll, occurred in unusual circumstances, or have some other historical significance, which are notable and have their own Wikipedia article. For crashes that killed notable people, refer to List of people who died in traffic collisions. The prevalence of bus crashes in this list is a function of severity rather than of frequency. This list records crashes from the year 2000. For earlier crashes, see List of traffic collisions (before 2000).



2000s

2000
 August 28NigeriaAbuja bus crash. A lorry crushed three buses after its brakes failed, rolling backwards into a crowded bus station, killing over 70. Related protest riots the next day killed four more people.
 November 5NigeriaIbadan road tanker explosion. A petrol tanker ploughed into a traffic jam and exploded, killing 100–200 people.
 December 25PhilippinesDavao del Sur bus crash. A speeding bus was rear-ended and driven off a 13-meter embankment by another bus in Bansalan, Davao del Sur, killing 38.

2001
 January 27AustraliaGerogery level crossing accident.
 February 28United KingdomSelby rail crash. A car was driven off the M62 motorway near a bridge onto railway tracks, causing the derailment of a passenger train and its subsequent collision with a freight train, killing 10.
 March 5PortugalHintze Ribeiro disaster. A bridge across the Douro river collapsed as a bus was crossing it, killing 59.
 March 16SudanKotsu bus crash. A bus collided with a tanker truck, killing at least 21 and injuring 50.
 March 19PhilippinesParañaque tanker explosion. A speeding diesel tanker crashed into five vehicles before bursting into flames in Parañaque, killing 14 and injuring three.
 March 19PhilippinesBulacan road collision. A cargo truck collided with a bus along the North Luzon Expressway in Bocaue, Bulacan, killing 14 and injuring 14.
 June 25TanzaniaSumbawanga truck crash. A truck overturned near Sumbawanga, killing 25 and injuring 30.
 August 1IndiaRajasthan road collision. A jeep collided head on with a bus, killing 13 and injuring 15.
 October 26PhilippinesAgusan del Norte bus crash. A bus hit a house crowded with mourners in Buenavista, Agusan del Norte, killing 21 and injuring six.

2002
 April 12IndiaCalcutta road collision. A van carrying Hindu pilgrims crashed into a truck, killing at least 21 and injuring 17.
 May 26United StatesI-40 bridge disaster. A barge collided with a bridge support in Oklahoma, causing a  section of the bridge to plunge into the Arkansas River, killing 14 and injuring 11.
 August 10PhilippinesZamboanga del Norte road crash. A van smashed into a speeding 10-wheeler cargo truck in Liloy, Zamboanga del Norte, killing 11 and injuring two.
 November 6EgyptEgypt bus crash. A tourist bus carrying some 50 people slammed into a truck loaded with rocks between Cairo and Sharm el-Sheikh, killing 27 and injuring 24.
 November 24PhilippinesQuezon bus crash. A bus fell 30–40 feet into a creek in Tagkawayan, Quezon, killing 33 and injuring six.

2003
 January 28IndiaWest Bengal bus crash. A luxury tourist bus collided head-on with a truck carrying paints and chemicals in West Bengal, killing 42.
 April 27PhilippinesQuezon road collision. A jeep smashed into an oncoming bus on a mountain road in Tagkawayan, Quezon, causing the bus to plunge into a ravine, killing 11 people and injuring 31.
 May 1South AfricaSol Plaatje Dam bus crash. The driver of a coach bus took a wrong turn and drove into a dam at night, killing 51.
 June 4IndiaKasganj level crossing disaster. A bus attempted to cross a closed level crossing and was sliced in half by a train, killing 30.
 July 10Hong KongTuen Mun Road bus accident. A bus plunged off a bridge following a collision with a lorry, killing 21.
 July 16United StatesSanta Monica Farmers Market crash. An elderly man drove his car into another car and then into a farmers' market, killing ten people and injuring 70.
 September 22PhilippinesCagayan bus crash. A passenger bus collided with another bus and a van before plunging into a ravine in Gattaran, Cagayan, killing 14.
 September 27PhilippinesBataan minibus crash. A minibus plowed into a waiting shed in Mariveles, Bataan, killing 14.
 October 8IndonesiaEast Java bus crash. A container truck collided with a bus head-on near Situbondo, then another truck collided with the rear of the bus which caught fire, killing 54. It was the deadliest road accident in Indonesia.
 October 21PakistanAbbottabad bus crash. A bus skidded off a bridge and fell into a ditch, killing at least 20 and injuring 35.
 November 15PhilippinesNegros Occidental road crash. A passenger jeepney rammed a stalled truck in Silay, Negros Occidental, killing 15.
 November 23MalaysiaMerapoh bus tragedy. A bus collided with another bus on Federal Route 8 near Merapoh, Pahang, killing 14.

2004
 January 31PhilippinesZambales bus collision. Two buses collided in Botolan, Zambales, killing 10.
 March 19FinlandKonginkangas bus disaster. The trailer of a truck carrying heavy paper rolls swerved into a bus, killing 23 and injuring 14.
 April 11United KingdomIngoldmells bus crash. A double-decker bus collided with pedestrians in the English seaside resort of Ingoldmells on the busiest day of the year, killing five.
 May 4Burkina FasoComoé bus crash. A fuel truck collided with a bus and burst into flames in Niangoloko, Comoé Province, near the border with Cote d'Ivoire, killing at least 35.
 May 24RomaniaMihăilești explosion. A truck loaded with ammonium nitrate rolled over and caught fire before exploding an hour later, killing at least 18 and injuring 13.
 June 16PakistanIslamabad bus crash. A bus collided with a truck and plunged from the Kaak bridge, killing at least 40 and injuring 10.
 August 18IranZahedan bus crash. A bus collided with a truck, killing 15 and injuring 20.
 October 9United StatesArkansas bus crash. A tour bus taking Chicago-area passengers to the casinos of Tunica, Mississippi plunged off Interstate 55, killing 15.
 November 6United KingdomUfton Nervet rail crash. A passenger train hit a car and derailed, killing seven and injuring 71.

2005
 February 3IndiaNagpur level crossing disaster. A crowded trailer being towed by a tractor was hit by a train, killing 55.
 April 2PhilippinesPangasinan bus crash. A passenger bus collided with a jeepney in San Fabian, Pangasinan, killing 18.
 April 8ZambiaKawambwa truck crash. A truck carrying students overturned while descending a hill, killing 44.
 April 27Sri LankaPolgahawela level crossing accident. A bus was hit by train, killing over 50.
 May 15VietnamTam Duong bus crash. A bus fell  down ravine after colliding with a motorcycle, killing 19.
 May 22PhilippinesBenguet bus crash. A passenger bus slammed into a roadside boulder in Tuba, Benguet, killing 27.
 June 7NepalBadarmude bus explosion. A bus struck a land mine, killing 38.

2006
 February 18AustraliaCardross road crash. A car hit a group of pedestrians in Cardross, Victoria, killing six.
 March 9TurkeyTokat bus crash. A bus carrying about 40 people drove off a road and plunged into the Kelkit River, killing at least 16 and injuring 11.
 April 17MexicoMaltrata bus crash. A bus crashed about  down a ravine and into a stream in Veracruz State, killing 57.
 May 11PhilippinesDavao del Norte bus crash. A van collided with a passenger bus in Panabo, Davao del Norte, killing 11.
 June 23EgyptSinai bus crash. A bus overturned and landed upside down between Nuweiba and Taba, killing 12.
 September 30CanadaDe la Concorde overpass collapse. A  section of a 3-lane overpass over Autoroute 19 collapsed, killing five and injuring six.
 October 28PhilippinesCotabalo truck crash. A dump truck lost its brakes while maneuvering a downhill curve, causing it to smash into several vehicles before plowing through villagers celebrating a religious feast in Makilala, Cotabato, killing 18.
 November 13South AfricaFaure level crossing accident. A truck carrying workers was hit by a train, killing 19 and injuring six.

2007
 January 6BangladeshComilla bus crash. A bus travelling from Dhaka to Chittagong crashed and caught fire, killing 40-70 people.
 February 2PhilippinesZamboanga del Sur truck explosion. A burning chemical truck exploded just as a passenger bus was passing beside it in Tigbao, Zamboanga del Sur, killing over 50.
 March 2United StatesBluffton University bus crash. A bus transporting the Bluffton University baseball team crashed through a barrier and landed on Interstate 75, killing seven.
 May 11IndiaBihar bus crash. A bus skidded off a bridge and fell into the Ganges river, killing 20.
 May 11IndiaOrrisa road collision. A jeep collided with an oil tanker lorry in Orissa, killing 11 and injuring four.
 June 5AustraliaKerang train accident. A train collided with a truck at the junction of the Murray Valley Highway and the Piangil railway line near Kerang, Victoria, killing 11.
 July 17Republic of the CongoCongo truck accident. A packed truck overturned at high speed near Pointe-Noire, killing 18.
 July 22PhilippinesSamar road crash. A truck collided with a motorcycle in Calbayog, Samar, killing 13 and injuring 30.
 July 22FranceRampe de Laffrey accident. A bus flew off the road and into a ravine near Vizille, killing 26 and injuring 24.
 August 1United StatesI-35W Mississippi River Bridge collapse. The structure and deck of a bridge collapsed into a river and the riverbanks, killing 13.
 August 13MalaysiaBukit Gantang bus crash. A bus crashed into a ditch at the North–South Expressway, killing 20.
 November 4AzerbaijanBaku–Gazakh motorway minibus crash. A minibus carrying twenty people slammed into a parked truck laden with stones, killing 14 and injuring four.

2008
 January 12CanadaBathurst Boys in Red accident. A semi-trailer truck collided with a van carrying the Bathurst High School basketball team outside Bathurst, New Brunswick, killing eight and injuring four.
 January 29PhilippinesCotabato road collision. A packed van collided head-on with a truck loaded with cement bags on a narrow highway in Carmen, Cotabato, killing at least 14 and injuring 20.
 February 29NigeriaZamfara bus crash. A commuter bus rolled over and plunged into a ditch along the Gusau-Funtua highway when a front tyre burst, killing 11.
 February 29GuatemalaVilla Canales bus disaster. A bus crashed into a 10-meter ravine after missing a sharp bend, killing 54 and injuring 25.
 April 16IndiaGujarat bus crash. A bus veered off a bridge and plunged into a canal in Vadodara, killing at least 47, 44 of whom were children.
 April 19SpainBenalmádena coach crash. An SUV collided with a bus full of tourists while trying to overtake it, killing nine and injuring 38.
 May 1Hong KongSai Kung bus crash. A tour bus flipped onto its side on Hiram's Highway in Sai Kung District, New Territories, killing 19 and injuring 43.
 May 8IndiaKashmir bus crash. A bus skidded off a road and fell into the Chenab River in Indian-administered Kashmir, killing at least 15.
 July 9BoliviaPotosi bus crash. A bus plunged down a cliff, killing at least 47.
 August 8United StatesSherman, Texas bus accident. A bus drove off an overpass bridge of U.S. 75, killing 17. 
 October 21United KingdomM6 motorway crash. A collision involving three lorries and two cars on the M6 motorway near Sandbach killed six, including three children and a baby.
 November 15Burkina FasoBoromo bus crash. A heavily-loaded truck carrying 80 people collided with an overloaded bus on National Highway 1 before catching fire, killing 66.
 December 14EgyptDahrut bus accident. A bus plunged into an irrigation ditch while traveling from Cairo to Minya, killing at least 55 and injuring 10.
 December 16IsraelIsraeli tour bus crash. A bus crashed off the road and rolled down a ravine between Ovda and Eilat, killing 25 and injuring 30 in the deadliest traffic accident in Israel's history.

2009
 February 21SlovakiaBrezno train accident. A train collided with a tourist coach on a level crossing, killing 12 and injuring 20.
 March 28PhilippinesCebu bus crash. A passenger bus collided with a 10-wheeler hauler truck in Naga, Cebu, killing 14.
 May 28BulgariaYambol bus crash. A bus crashed into a group of pedestrians, killing 18 and injuring 20.
 July 24RussiaRostov-on-Don bus crash. A bus collided with a petrol tanker, killing at least 21.
 July 26United StatesTaconic State Parkway crash.
 July 27TanzaniaKorogwe bus crash. A bus collided with a lorry after bursting a tire, killing 28.
 July 30SpainSant Pol de Mar bus crash. A double-decker bus carrying Dutch tourists left the highway on a bend and hit a car and a metal crash barrier before overturning, killing six and injuring 36-44.
 August 14RomaniaScânteia train accident. A bus collided with a train on County Road 248C, killing at least 14.
 September 19ChinaNanchang road collision. A maintenance vehicle was rear-ended by a truck and plunged off a viaduct in Jiangxi province, killing at least 16.
 October 8PhilippinesDavao de Oro road crash. A multicab and a truck collided in Nabunturan, Davao de Oro, killing 11 and injuring seven.
 October 31KenyaModagashe bus crash. A bus rolled over, killing at least 15 and injuring 16.
 November 2IranIlam bus crash. A bus carrying pilgrims on their way to holy sites in Iraq crashed into a warehouse, killing at least 28.
 November 2PeruArequipa road collision. Two buses and a truck collided, killing at least 14 and injuring over 40.
 December 24PeruEspinar bus crash. A bus rolled over the edge of a cliff, killing 41 and injuring 22.

2010s

2010
 January 14Papua New GuineaPapua New Guinea bus crash. A bus and a public motor vehicle (PMV, a refitted truck used for public transportation) crashed head-on, killing at least 40.
 February 8AfghanistanSalang avalanches. At least 36 avalanches struck the southern approach to the Salang Tunnel, killing 175.
 February 13NigeriaPort Harcourt bus electrocution. A power line broke, striking two buses and electrocuting the occupants, killing 11.
 February 15PhilippinesCagayan road crash. A 30-seater passenger jeepney and a trailer truck collided in Piat, Cagayan, killing 14 and injuring 13.
 February 17IndiaJalaun bus crash. A bus plunged into the Yamuna River, killing 22.
 February 22PeruViru bus crash. Two buses collided head-on on the Panamerican Highway, killing 38 deaths and injuring 58.
 March 7PhilippinesLa Union bus crash. A bus lost its brakes before slamming into a tree in Pugo, La Union, killing 12.
 June 13PhilippinesBalamban bus accident. A bus fell off a  ravine in Balamban, Cebu, killing 21.
 July 2Democratic Republic of CongoSouth Kivu fuel tank explosion. A fuel tanker overturned and exploded, creating a fireball that devastated the town of Sange in South Kivu province, killing 230 and injuring 196 in the deadliest road accident in history.
 July 3PhilippinesCebu bus crash. A passenger bus lost its brakes and rammed a concrete wall in Toledo, Cebu, killing 15.
 July 11IrelandR238 traffic collision. A Volkswagen Passat and Toyota Corolla collided on the R238 road on the Inishowen Peninsula, killing eight in Ireland's deadliest road accident.
 August 18PhilippinesBenguet bus crash. A bus lost its brakes before falling into a  ravine in Sablan, Benguet, killing 41.
 October 10MalaysiaNorth–South Expressway crash. Two buses, three cars and a van crashed along the North–South Expressway, killing 12 and injuring over 50. 
 October 12UkraineMarhanets train accident. A bus ran a red light and crossed a railroad crossing before getting hit by a train, killing 43 dead and injuring nine.
 December 1NigeriaAlakija tanker explosion. A fuel tanker crashed and exploded, destroying nearby structures as well as two buses and two cars, killing 20. 
 December 20MalaysiaCameron Highlands bus crash. A double-decker bus crashed at the Second East–West Highway of the Perak–Pahang state border, killing 27.
 December 25IndiaBadaun bus crash. A bus collided with a van full of mourners in Uttar Pradesh, killing up to 35 and injuring 14.

2011
 March 12United StatesWorld Wide Tours bus crash. A bus crashed on Interstate 95, killing 15.
 May 31IndiaAssam bus crash. A bus carrying wedding guests skidded off a wooden bridge and fell into a pond in Hajo, Assam, killing 31.
 July 11BangladeshMirsharai bus crash. A pick-up truck carrying mostly students veered off the road and plunged into a ditch, killing at least 40.
 July 22ChinaXinyang bus fire. A bus caught fire along National Highway 105, killing 41 and injuring six.
 August 5Cote d'IvoireAbidjan bus crash. A bus veered off a bridge in Abidjan and plunged into the lagoon below, killing 37. 
 September 27PakistanKallar Kahar school bus accident. While travelling along the M-2 motorway, a school bus skidded due to mechanical brake failure and fell into a ravine, killing 37 and injuring at least 70.
 November 4United KingdomM5 motorway crash. A 34-vehicle crash near Taunton on the M5 motorway killed seven and injured 51.
 November 16ChinaGansu school bus crash. A school bus collided head-on with a coal truck, killing 21.
 December 1PhilippinesSarangani road collision. A van slammed into a parked cargo truck in Malungon, Sarangani, killing 13 and injuring five.

2012
 March 4 – Guinea – Beyla truck crash. 50 people were killed and 27 injured after a lorry in which they were travelling to a weekly market plunged into a ravine.
 March 13 – Switzerland – Sierre coach crash. A coach carrying school teachers and pupils crashed into a wall in the Sierre Tunnel. Of the 52 people on board, 28 were killed in the crash.
 April 20 – Mexico – Álamo bus accident. A trailer truck collided with an overloaded passenger bus. 43 were killed, with another 17 seriously injured.
 May 13 – Philippines – Bontoc jeep crash. 11 killed after a jeepney plunged into a ravine in Bontoc, Mountain Province.
 May 17 – Vietnam – Dak Lak bus crash. A crowded bus plunged into the banks of the Serepok river, killing 34 people and injuring 21.
 May 21 – Albania– Qafa e Vishës bus accident. A bus plunged 80 metres (260 ft) off a cliff, killing 13.
 June 3 – Pakistan – Kahuta bus crash. At least 25 people were killed and 60 injured when a bus fell into a 100-feet-deep ditch.
 July 12 – Nigeria – Okobie road tanker explosion. A tanker overturned and exploded; the death toll was initially placed at 95.
 July 13 – South Africa – Hectorspruit level crossing accident. A coal train collided with a truck on a controlled level crossing, killing 26.
 July 21 – Philippines – Caibiran truck crash. 14 people were killed while 10 were injured when the dump truck they were riding lost its brakes and fell sideways near Caibiran, Biliran.
 July 30 – India – Haryana truck crash. 29 pilgrims were killed in a collision between two trucks.
 August 26 – China – Shaanxi bus–tanker crash. A double-decker sleeper bus and a tanker loaded with methanol collided and burst into flames, resulting in 36 deaths.
 October 2 – Philippines – Sarrat road collision. 13 people, mostly high school students, were killed when a 14-wheeler truck rammed a jeep in Sarrat, Ilocos Norte.
 October 30 – Pakistan – Bahawalpur road collision. 26 people were killed after a passenger van and a truck collided.
 November 1 – Saudi Arabia – Riyadh truck crash. A fuel truck crashed into an intersection flyover, killing 26 people.
 November 17 – Egypt – Manfalut railway accident. A school bus was hit by a train on a crossing. At least 50 children and the bus driver died, and about 17 people were injured.

2013
 January 12 – Nepal – Chhatiwan bus crash. At least 29 people were killed and 12 injured after a bus veered off a narrow mountain road in thick fog.
 February 4 – United Arab Emirates – Al Ain bus accident. A bus carrying migrant workers collided with another vehicle in Abu Dhabi emirate. At least 22 people died and another 24 were injured.
 February 7 – Zambia – Chibombo bus crash. A bus collided with a semi-truck and a sport utility vehicle on the Great North Road, resulting in the deaths of 51 persons.
 February 9 – Chile – Tomé tragedy. A bus carrying football fans fell into a ravine about 100 meters, killing 16.  
 February 27 – Kenya – Mwingi bus crash. At least 35 people were killed after a bus overturned 
 May 7 – Mexico – Ecatepec de Morelos gas tanker explosion. A tank truck driver lost control and ran into several cars and houses before the truck exploded on Federal Highway 85. 27 people were killed and more than 30 injured.
 May 25 - Pakistan - Gujrat gas bus explosion. A gas cylinder exploded in a school minivan. The blast killed at least 17 people, including 16 children and a bus driver and another 7 children were wounded.
 June 23 – Montenegro – Podgorica bus crash. A bus carrying Romanian tourists plunged into a ravine, killing 19 and injuring 28.
 July 13 – Russia – Oznobishino bus crash. A truck carrying gravel collided at high speed with a bus. At least 18 people died and 60 were injured.
 July 21 – Egypt – Northern Egypt army bus crash. An army bus crashed into a truck along the Mediterranean coastal highway, killing 15 soldiers.
 July 28 – Italy – Monteforte Irpino bus crash. A tour bus returning from a pilgrimage went off the highway into a ravine, killing 39 and injuring 19.
 August 21 – Malaysia – Genting Highlands bus crash. A bus carrying 53 passengers crashed into a ravine. 37 were killed and 16 injured in the deadliest road accident in Malaysia.
 August 21 – Indonesia – Cisarua bus crash. At least 19 people were killed and more than a dozen injured when a car and a packed church bus collided and plunged into a river in West Java.
 August 29 – Kenya – Narok bus crash. At least 41 people were killed and 33 others injured when a bus veered off the road and plunged into a valley, rolling over several times.
 September 5 – South Africa – Pinetown crash. An articulated truck drove through a red light at high speed, killing 27 people and injuring at least 80.
 September 5 – United Kingdom – Sheppey Crossing crash. A huge pile-up began on the Sheppey Crossing, which involved more than 130 vehicles and injured at least 68 people.
 September 8 – Romania– Valea Lupului minibus train collision. 11 people died after a collision between a minibus and a train in Iași County.
 September 9 – Guatemala – San Martin Jilotepeque bus disaster. A bus crashed into a 200-meter ravine after missing a sharp bend. 48 people died and another 37 were wounded.
 September 9 - Iran – Qom bus collision. A collision between two buses killed 44 people and injured 39 others.
 September 18 – Canada – Ottawa bus–train crash. A double-decker bus and a passenger train collided, killing 6 and injuring 35.
 October 10 – India – Hoshiarpur truck accident. At least 20 people were killed and another 35 injured when a truck carrying Hindu pilgrims crashed into a gorge.
 October 12 – Peru – Santa Teresa bus disaster. A makeshift bus carrying 51 indigenous Quechua plunged off a cliff and ended up in the Cachimayo River, killing everyone on board. This crash tied with the 2018 Pasamayo bus crash as the deadliest road crash in Peruvian history.
 October 19 – Philippines – Atimonan road crash. Three buses and four trucks collided in Atimonan, Quezon; 20 were killed and 54 injured.
 October 24 – Thailand – Wang Nuea bus crash. At least 20 people were killed and 16 injured after a bus carrying Buddhist worshippers from a temple plunged into a ravine in Lampang Province.
 October 28 – China – Kuytun road collision. 10 people died and two were others injured when a cement mixer rear-ended a motorized tricycle, then collided with a minibus in Xinjiang.
 October 30 – India – Mahabubnagar bus accident. A bus hit a culvert, damaging its fuel tank and causing a fire, killing 45 people and injuring 7.
 November 11 – South Africa – Mpumalanga bus crash. 29 people died after a bus collided with a truck in Mpumalanga province.
 November 18 - Egypt – Egypt railway crossing collision. At least 30 people were killed and 28 were wounded about 40 km south of Cairo when a train ploughed into a lorry and a mini-bus.
 December 10 – Egypt– Kafr Elle Zayat fuel truck explosion. An exploding fuel truck killed 13 people.
 December 16 – Philippines – Metro Manila Skyway bus accident. A bus fell off the Metro Manila Skyway, killing 18 and injuring 20.

2014
 January 7 – Nigeria – Kirikiri tanker explosion. A tanker loaded with about 33,000 liters of gasoline rammed into parked vehicles. The spilling of the gasoline resulted in an explosion that killed about 15 people, leaving several others seriously injured.
 January 15 – Pakistan – Nawab Shah bus crash. A school bus collided head on with a garbage truck, killing 20.
 February 3 – India – Khambatki Ghat bus crash. At least 10 people were killed and 35 injured after a tourist bus fell off a bridge in Maharashtra state.
 February 4 – Ukraine – Sumy train bus collision. A bus was hit by a train, killing 13 and injuring 6.
 February 7 - Philippines - Mountain Province bus accident. 17 passengers are killed when their bus falls off a 150-meter ravine in Bontoc, Mountain Province.
 March 10 – Egypt – Asyut bus crash. A truck collided with a bus on a highway that was flooded after heavy rains, killing 16 people.
 March 11 – Egypt – Suez bus crash. 24 were killed and 25 others were injured in a collision between a truck and a public transport bus at Ain Moussa power station
 April 13 – Mexico – Acayucan bus crash. A bus traveling from Villahermosa to Mexico City collided with a broken-down truck and caught fire. 36 were killed and 4 injured.
 April 20 – Pakistan – Pannu Aqil bus crash. A bus rammed into a disabled flatbed trailer parked on the side of a highway, killing at least 36 people.
 May 18 – Colombia – Fundación bus fire. A bus caught fire, killing 32 children.
 June 17 – India – Saharanpur bus crash. A bus fell into a mountain gorge, killing 13 people and injuring dozens more.
 June 27 – Afghanistan– Nangarhar road collision. A truck and a minibus collided, killing 17 people. Nine more were injured
 August 9 – China – Nyemo bus crash. 44 people were killed when a tour bus fell off a 30-foot cliff after crashing in a pileup involving a sports utility vehicle and a pickup truck in southern Tibet.
 August 17 – Afghanistan– Badghis truck crash. A truckloaded with people and animals crashed in a mountainous area, killing 33 people and injuring 13 others.
 August 22 – Egypt– Sharm el-Sheikh bus crash. At least 33 people were killed when two buses coming from opposite directions collided on a main road about 30 miles from Sharm el-Sheikh.
 August 31 – Afghanistan– Herat tanker crash. At least 23 people were killed after a fuel tanker collided with a van.
 October 6 - Nepal - Doti bus accident. A bus plummeted some 300 meters down a road killing at least 41 people.
 October 13 – Egypt – Edfu bus collision. At least 30 people were killed in a crash involving three minibuses in Aswan Governorate.
 November 5 – Egypt – Damanhur bus collision. A school bus, a fuel tanker and two passenger vehicles collided and caught fire, killing at least 17 people and injured 18.
 November 11 – Pakistan – Khairpur bus crash. A bus collided with a truck, killing 56.
 November 24 - Nepal - Jajarkot bus accident. 47 passengers died when a bus plunged into the Bheri River.
 December 22 – United Kingdom – Glasgow bin lorry crash. When a bin lorry driver passed out at the wheel in George Square the vehicle mounted the pavement, killing 6 and injuring 15.

2015
 January 10 – Pakistan – Karachi traffic accident. An oil tanker travelling on the wrong side of the road collided with a bus, killing at least 62.
 February 3 – United States – Valhalla train crash. A Mercedes-Benz ML350 SUV collided with a commuter train at a grade crossing; six were killed and 15 injured.
 February 4 – China – Meizhou bus crash. Ten people, including four children, were killed in an accident in Guangdong Province involving a minibus during the first day for the peak travel season centered on the Chinese New Year. 
 March 11 – Tanzania – Iringa road accident. A bus and two trucks collided, resulting in 41 dead and 25 injured.
 March 15 - Brazil - Joinville bus accident. At least 54 people died and ten were injured when a tourist bus veered off a road and plunged approximately  into a ravine in Santa Catarina state.
 March 21 – Egypt – Giza bus accident. A bus fell off a bridge into a canal, killing at least 35, many of whom worked for a private construction company.
 March 24 – Peru – Huarmey bus accident. A bus crashed into traffic, killing at least 37 and injuring 70.
 April 10 - Morocco - Tan-Tan bus crash. At least 33 people were killed, most of them children, when a bus burst into flames after colliding with a gas tanker.
 May 5 - India - Panna bus fire. At least 21 people died after a bus fell into a ditch and caught fire in Madhya Pradesh.
 June 13 - India - Andhra Pradesh bus crash. 22 people, including seven children, were killed when a van carrying Hindus returning from a pilgrimage to the Tirupati-Tirumala temple lost control on a bridge and plunged into a river.
 June 13 - India - Harchandpur road collision. A head-on collision between a lorry and two tractors carrying dozens heading to a prayer ceremony killed 17 people, including five children, in Uttar Pradesh.
 June 7 - Peru - Huanuco truck crash. A dump truck crammed with dozens of school children dropped from a cliff in the Andes as it returned from festivities in the Huanuco region, killing 17 people and injuring 54
 July 1 - China - . Ji'an bus accident. In Jilin Province, a bus carrying visiting South Korean civil servants went off a bridge. Ten Koreans and the Chinese driver were killed, and another 17 were injured (eight seriously).
 July 29 - Mexico - Zacatecas road accident. At least 27 people were killed and 149 injured after an out of control truck ran into a religious procession.
 August 9 – Sudan – Um Al-Hasan truck collision. Two passenger trucks collided while moving in opposite directions, killing 19 and injuring 12.
 September 17 - South Sudan - Juba tanker explosion. A fuel truck explosion killed up to 193 bystanders. 
 October 23 – France – Puisseguin road crash. A bus carrying elderly day-trippers hit a truck head-on and caught fire, killing 43.
 December 14 – Argentina – Rosario de la Frontera road accident. A bus carrying border police plunged off a bridge, killing 43 and injuring 8.
 December 20 – Thailand – Doi Saket bus crash. 12 Malaysian tourists and a Thai guide were killed after their bus hit a car and ran off a curve near Chiang Mai.

2016
 February 6 – Nepal – Pasang Lhamu bus crash. A bus fell off the Keurini cliff into a ravine, killing 11 and injuring 12.
 February 10 – Pakistan – Sheikhupura fuel truck explosion. At least 10 people, including six schoolchildren, were killed in a fireball after a tanker carrying liquified petroleum gas collided with a car.
 February 18 – Ghana – Kintampo bus collision. A head-on collision between a bus and a truck resulted in 53 killed and at least 23 injured.
 March 19 – Saudi Arabia – Medina bus crash. At least 19 Egyptian pilgrims were killed when their bus on a highway linking the two holy cities of Medina and Mecca.
 March 20 –  Spain – Erasmus bus crash. A bus carrying Erasmus students of 19 countries from the Fallas Festival in Valencia collided with a car on the Autovía A-7 motorway, near the town of Freginals. 13 students were killed, all female.
 April 3 –  Saudi Arabia – Wadi bin Hashbal van collision. Two vans collided, killing 15 people, including six children.
 May 8 – Afghanistan – Ghazni Province road crash. Two buses collided with a fuel tanker, killing 73 and injuring 50.
 June 6 –  Saudi Arabia – Saudi Arabia bus crash. An accident involving a bus and a truck killed 15 people and left 60 injured.
 June 7 –  United States –  Kalamazoo bicycle crash. A pickup truck crashed into a group of cyclists, killing 5 and injuring 4.
 July 19 – Taiwan – Taoyuan bus fire. A tour bus caught fire, killing all 26 on board.
 August 15 – Nepal – Nepal bus crashes.
 August 15 – Nepal – Nepal bus crashes. In the second of the two bus crashes on the same day, a bus slipped off of a high mountain road near Siddheshwar, Baitadi, falling  and killing 4 and injuring 30.
 September 3 – Afghanistan – Zabul Province road crash. A bus collided with a fuel tanker, killing 38 and injuring 28.
 October 17 - Pakistan – Khanpur bus collision. At least 24 people were killed and more than 70 injured after two buses collided.
 October 23 – United States – I-10 tour bus crash. A tour bus collided with the back of a stationary semi-trailer truck, killing 13 and injuring 31.
 November 21 – United States – Chattanooga school bus crash. A school bus carrying 37 elementary students crashed, killing 6 and injuring 32.

2017
 January 2 – Thailand – Chonburi road collision. A minivan and a pick-up truck both packed with passengers collided, killing 25 people.
 January 21 – Italy – Verona bus crash. A bus carrying school children from Hungary crashed and caught fire on the A4 near Verona a few minutes after midnight. 17 people were killed and 25 injured.
 January 28 – Madagascar – Anjozorobe truck crash. At least 47 people, including 10 children and a newly-wed couple, were killed when a truck carrying wedding guests swerved off the road and plunged into a river.
 February 13 – Taiwan – Taipei bus accident. At least 32 people were killed when a tour bus crashed on a highway.
 February 18 – Malaysia – Johor Bahru cyclist accident. Nine teenage cyclists were killed when hit by a car at the Middle Ring Road in Johor Bahru.
 February 20 – Philippines – Tanay bus accident. A tourist bus carrying more than 50 passengers lost control and hit an electric post in Tanay, Rizal. 15 people were killed and 40 injured.
 April 18 – Philippines – Nueva Ecija bus accident. A 45-seater bus carrying 77 passengers fell into a ravine in Carranglan, killing 31 and injuring 46.
 April 19 – India – Nerwa bus crash. 44 people were killed when a bus rolled off the road and fell into the Tons river in Himachal Pradesh.
 April 21 – South Africa – Bronkhorstspruit minibus crash. A minibus crashed and burned killing at least 20 children.
 May 6 – Tanzania – Karatu bus accident. 32 schoolchildren, two teachers and a minibus driver where killed when their vehicle plunged into a ravine in the Arusha region  .
 May 28 – France – A motorcyclist on the A4 autoroute to Paris fell off when he was struck by a vehicle pulling into his lane. The motorcycle stood itself up and continued along the motorway, periodically scraping the median barrier, thereby keeping balance. It was found in Bercy,  from the location of the collision. The riderless motorcycle was witnessed and filmed by passing drivers.
 June 25 – Pakistan – Bahawalpur explosion. A tanker truck overturned and began leaking its cargo of petrol, which people gathered to collect. 219 were killed and at least 34 injured when it exploded.
 July 3 – Germany – Stammbach bus crash. 18 people were killed when a tour bus burst into flames after colliding with a lorry.
 July 5 – Central African Republic – Bambari truck crash. At least 78 people were killed and dozens more were injured when a truck heavily loaded with goods and passengers crashed.
 August 26 – United Kingdom – M1 motorway crash. A crash involving two lorries and a minibus killed eight and injured three.
 October 28 – Nepal – Prithvi Highway bus crash. A bus carrying passengers returning from a Hindu festival to Kathmandu skidded off the Prithvi Highway and plunged into a river, killing at least 31 people.
 November 20 – Pakistan – Khairpur bus crash. A head-on collision between a mini-bus and a truck killed at least 20 people and left three others injured.
 December 14 – France – Perpignan crash. A train crashed into a school bus on a level crossing between Millas and Saint-Féliu-d'Amont in the Arrondissement of Perpignan. Six pupils were killed and 24 injured.
 December 23 – Egypt – Cairo bus crash. A small bus crashed into a truck, killing 13 passengers and injuring eight.
 December 23 – India – Rajasthan bus crash. A bus plunged into a river in Sawai Madhopur, killing 33 people.
 December 25 – Philippines – Agoo car crash. 20 passengers are killed when their jeep collides with a passenger bus in Agoo, La Union.
 December 31 – Kenya – Migaa road collision. 36 died after a bus collided with a truck.

2018
 January 2 – Peru – Pasamayo bus crash. A coach plunged off a cliff on a coastal road, killing 51. This incident tied with the 2013 Peru bus disaster as the deadliest road crash in Peruvian history.
 January 4 – South Africa – Hennenman–Kroonstad train crash. A train collided with a truck at a level crossing in the Free State. The train derailed, and seven of the twelve carriages caught fire. 21 people were killed and 254 others were injured.
 January 18 – Kazakhstan – Yrgyz bus fire. A bus carrying Uzbek migrant workers caught fire, killing 52.
 January 20 – Turkey – Eskişehir bus crash. A bus hit several trees on the side of the road, killing 11 and injuring 44.
 February 10 – Hong Kong – Tai Po bus accident. A double-decker bus overturned in the New Territories. 19 people were killed and 65 injured.
 February 14 – Libya – Bani Walid truck crash. At least 23 people were killed when a truck carrying hundreds of refugees and migrants overturned.
 March 20 – Philippines – Sablayan bus accident. 19 passengers died after a passenger bus careened off a winding dirt road and fell into a ravine in Sablayan, Occidental Mindoro.
 March 21 – Thailand – Nakhon Ratchasima bus accident. A chartered tour bus lost control on a downhill curve and slid off the side of the road, killing at least 18 people and injuring dozens more.
 April 6 – Canada – Humboldt Broncos bus crash. 16 people were killed and 13 others injured when a semi-trailer truck and a bus carrying a junior ice hockey team collided near Tisdale, Saskatchewan.
 April 22 – North Korea – North Hwanghae bus accident. A bus in North Hwanghae Province transporting Chinese tourists fell off a bridge, killing 32 Chinese tourists and 4 North Koreans.
 May 25 – Uganda – Kiryandongo bus accident. A bus in Kiryandongo District collided with the rear a tractor travelling without lights at night, and then hit a truck head-on. At least 22 were killed, including four children, and 15 injured.
 July 1 – India – Pauri Garhwal bus accident. An overcrowded bus travelling from Bhaun to Ramnagar crashed into a gorge in Pauri Garhwal, Uttarakhand. At least 48 people were killed and twelve were injured.
 July 6 – Cameroon – Boutourou bus crash. At least 28 people were killed and five others injured when a bus drove into a river 
 July 30 – Vietnam – Central Vietnam minibus crash. 13 people were killed and four injured when a minibus carrying wedding guests collided head-on with a large container truck.
 August 12 – Ecuador – Molleturo bus crash. At least 12 football fans were killed and 30 injured when the bus they were travelling in overturned.
 August 14 – Ecuador – Quito bus crash. At least 24 people were killed and 19 others injured when a bus with foreign license plates struck an all-terrain vehicle and overturned, slamming into three houses on the side of the road.
 September 1 – Ecuador – Cuenca bus crash. 10 people, including three children died when a bus crashed and overturned.
 September 12 – India – Telangana bus accident. An overcrowded bus rolled into a gorge in the Jagtial district of Telangana, killing at least 57 people and injuring 31.
 October 6 – United States – Schoharie limousine crash. A stretch limousine failed to stop at an intersection, killing all 18 in the vehicle and two pedestrians.
 October 6 – Democratic Republic of the Congo – Mbuba road tanker explosion. A fuel truck collided with another truck and later exploded, killing at least 50 people and injuring more than 100 others.
 October 10 – Kenya – Kericho bus crash. 55 people were killed when their bus left the road, rolled down a slope and crashed, with the roof of the bus ripped off.
 October 28 – China – Chongqing bus crash. A bus with 15 passengers plunged off Wanzhou Yangtze River Bridge into the Yangtze River after a passenger attacked the driver for missing her stop. 13 bodies were recovered, two remain missing.
 October 28 – Pakistan – Kohistan bus crash. At least 17 people were killed after a bus plunged into a deep ravine.
 November 3  – China – Lanzhou toll accident. A truck rammed into a line of waiting cars. 15 people were killed and another 44 injured in the 31 vehicle crash.
 November 7 – Zimbabwe – Rusape bus crash. A collision between two buses killed 50 people and left about 80 others hospitalized, some with serious injuries.
 November 16 – Zimbabwe – Gwanda bus fire. At least 42 passengers died after a suspected gas tank exploded on a bus.
 December 21 – Nepal – Tulsipur bus crash. A bus carrying college students and teachers veered off a highway in a mountainous area and plunged into a river, killing at least 21 people and injuring 15 others.

2019
 January 11 – Canada – Westboro station bus crash. A double-decker bus swerved and hit a bus shelter on approach to Westboro Station in Ottawa, Ontario, tearing off part of the upper deck. Three passengers were killed and 23 injured.
 January 21 – Pakistan – Hub accident. A bus collided with a tank truck in Balochistan. At least 26 people were killed and 16 others suffered burn injuries. 
 February 20 - Bangladesh - A collision in Dhaka between a pickup van and a car  led to the latter's gas cylinder exploding. The fire then spread to a group of buildings being used to store chemicals. The fire left at least 80 people dead and 50 others injured.
 April 17 – Portugal – Madeira bus crash. A tour bus carrying German tourists plunged off a road on Madeira island, killing 29 and injuring 27.
 April 25 – United States – Lakewood semi-truck crash. A runaway semi-truck crashed into traffic on Interstate 70 in Colorado, killing 4 and injuring 10.
 May 12 – Kenya – Tana River bus crash. Ten people died after a bus crashed into a truck on the side of the road.
 May 21 – Philippines – Libon jeep crash. 10 persons died while 20 others were injured when a jeep rolled over in Libon, Albay.
 May 29 – Mexico – 2019 Maltrata bus crash. A tour bus and a semitruck collided and burst into flames on a mountain road in Veracruz State, killing at least 21 people and injuring 30 others.
 June 8 – Philippines – San Fernando truck crash. 13 persons died while 41 others were injured a jeep fell into a ravine in San Fernando, Camarines Sur.
 June 12 – Egypt – Helwan bus crash. 14 people died and 10 others were injured when two microbuses crashed on a highway.
 June 17 – South Africa – Modjadjiskloof bus crash. At least 24 people were killed when a bus and a taxi van collided in Limpopo Province.
 June 20 - India - Kullu bus accident. An overloaded bus fell into a deep drain in Himachal Pradesh. At least 44 people died and 34 others were injured.
 July 8 – India – Agra bus accident. At least 29 people died after a bus hit a divider and fell into a gap between two flyovers on the Yamuna Expressway.
 August 10 - Tanzania - Morogoro tanker explosion. A fuel tanker crashed and people gathered at the accident site to collect the fuel. The tanker exploded, killing over 100 people and injuring at least 47 others.
 August 18 - Uganda - Western Uganda tanker explosion. At least 19 people were killed when a fuel truck exploded after losing control and ramming into three cars
 September 17 – Philippines – T'Boli truck accident. A truck fell down a ravine in T'Boli, South Cotabato, leaving 20 people dead and 12 injured.
 September 22 – Pakistan – Babusar bus accident. A bus carrying approximately 60 people slammed into a mountain after the brakes failed while making a sharp turn, killing at least 26 people and injuring another 12.
 September 29 – China – Yixing bus crash. At least 36 people were killed and dozens of others wounded after a collision between a packed bus and a truck along the Changchun-Shenzhen expressway in Jiangsu province.
 October 5 – Romania – Sfântu Gheorghe minibus accident. A minibus was hit by a truck driving on the wrong side of the road, killing 10 and injuring 8.
 October 5 – United Kingdom – Totnes bus crash. A double-decker bus overturned on the A385 road in Devon, injuring over 50 people but killing none.
 October 17 – Saudi Arabia – Medina bus crash. 35 people were killed and four injured after a bus carrying Muslim pilgrims collided with a truck.
 October 31 – Philippines – Conner truck crash. At least 19 people were killed and 21 others were injured after a truck they rented fell into a ravine in Conner, Apayao.
 November 13 – Slovakia – Nitra bus crash. A lorry carrying gravel collided with a passenger bus, killing 12 people in the country's deadliest road accident in a decade
 December 1 – Russia – Zabaykalsky bus crash. 19 passengers died when a bus skidded off a bridge in Zabaykalsky Krai and plunged into the Kuenga river.
 December 2 – Tunisia – Ain Snoussi bus crash. At least 26 people were killed when their bus careened into a ravine.
 December 15 – Nepal – Sindhupalchowk bus crash. A bus carrying Hindu pilgrims veered off a highway and crashed, killing at least 14 people and injuring 18.
 December 18 – Mexico – Jalisco highway collision. At least 14 people were killed and 12 others were injured when a van crashed into a truck on a highway in Jalisco state and burst into flames.
 December 23 – Indonesia – Pagar Alam bus crash. At least 27 passengers were killed and more than a dozen others injured after a bus plunged into a ravine in the southern part of Sumatra.
 December 28 – Egypt – Port Said bus crash. 22 people were killed in a collision between a minibus carrying workers and a truck.

2020s

2020
 January 5 – United States – Pennsylvania Turnpike crash. Icy conditions caused a tour bus to turn over and a chain reaction of other vehicles to crash. 5 people died and 60 others were injured.
 January 6 – Peru – Southern Peru bus crash. At least 16 people died after a bus collided with other vehicles and rolled over. 
 January 9 – Iran – Mazandaran bus crash. At least 20 people died and 24 others were injured in an accident on a bus heading from Tehran to Gonbad.
 January 10 – India – Kannauj bus crash. At least 20 people were killed when a double-decker bus caught fire after ramming into a truck. 
 March 2 – South Africa – Centane bus crash. 25 people were killed and approximately 62 were injured when a 65-seater bus plunged into a deep gorge. in Centane, Eastern Cape.
 March 9 – Ghana – Kintampo bus crash. 35 people were killed  when two buses collided on a busy road.
 April 23 – Australia – Eastern Freeway truck crash. A drunk driver on Melbourne's Eastern Freeway ploughed into four police officers during a traffic stop, killing them instantly, after he swerved onto the emergency lane.
 July 6 – Colombia – Tasajera explosion. A tanker truck overturned. While locals tried to collect the fuel, it exploded, leaving 45 people dead and at least 19 injured.
 July 7 – China – Anshun bus crash. A local bus plunged into the Hongshan Reservoir. 21 people died and 16 others were injured.
 July 28 – Mali – Kangara road accident. At least 22 people were killed and 21 injured when a minibus collided with a dump truck.
 October 11 – Thailand – Cha Choeng Sao bus crash. At least 17 passengers were killed and more than dozen injured when a bus collided with a train.
 November 25 – Brazil – Taguai bus crash. At least 41 people were killed after a crash between a bus and a truck in São Paulo state.
 December 31 – Algeria – Ain Mguel road accident. 20 people, mostly African nationals, died when a vehicle carrying them overturned in the desert province of Tamanrasset. 11 people were injured.

2021
 January 19 – India – Surat truck accident. At least 15 laborers were crushed to death by a truck in Gujarat while they were sleeping by a road.
 January 27 – Cameroon – Dschang bus-truck crash. A crash on the Dschang Cliff, West Region resulted in the deaths of 53 people, after a truck illegally carrying fuel collided with a passenger bus.
 February 11 – United States – Icy conditions from an ice storm caused a massive 133-vehicle pileup on Interstate 35W in Fort Worth, Texas. 6 were killed and 95 more were injured in the pileup.
 February 16 – India – Sidhi bus accident. A bus fell into a canal after the driver lost control. At least 51 people died.
 February 26 – Ghana – Asafo-Akyem bus crash. Two buses crashed head-on, killing 19 people on the Accra-Kumasi highway.
 March 2 – United States – Imperial County car crash. 13 people were killed and 13 others wounded when an SUV and semi-truck collided in Imperial County, California.
 March 2 – Bolivia – Colomi bus crash. A bus traveling along Route 7 fell into a ravine, causing 21 deaths and 17 injuries.
 March 5 – Egypt – Atfih bus crash. A trailer-truck crashed into a microbus, killing at least 18 people and injuring five others. 
 April 1 – Cote d'Ivoire – Nambonkaha bus crash. 16 people died when a bus collided with a semi-trailer truck.
 April 4 – China – Jiangsu road crash. A four-vehicle collision involving a bus on the Shenyang–Haikou Expressway in Jiangsu caused by a truck tire falling off killed 11 and injured 19.
 April 5 – Cote d'Ivoire – Cote d'Ivoire road crashes. At least 14 people were killed in two separate accidents on the highway linking Abidjan to the north of the country.  
 April 14 – Egypt – Asyut bus crash. 20 people were killed and three injured when a bus collided with a truck loaded with cement, which was stopping due to a malfunction, and caught fire.
 May 20 – Pakistan – Sukkur bus crash. A speeding bus overturned on a highway, killing at least 13 passengers and injuring 29 others. 
 May 24 – Guinea-Bissau – Cambesse truck crash. 14 people died after a cargo truck crashed into village homes.
 June 11 – Pakistan – Khuzdar bus crash. A speeding bus carrying dozens of pilgrims overturned in Balochistan, killing at least 18 people and injuring 42. 
 July 15 – United Kingdom – Bowburn crash. A distracted driver killed three people on the A1(M) near Bowburn when his lorry caught fire after crashing into stationary traffic.
 July 19 – Pakistan – Dera Ghazi Khan bus-truck collision. A passenger bus coming from Sialkot to Rajanpur collided head-on with a truck on Taunsa Road in Dera Ghazi Khan, killing 33 people and injuring more than 40.
 July 31 – Democratic Republic of the Congo – Kibuba fuel truck crash. 33 people died in a collision between a fuel truck and a crowded bus. 
 September 4 – China – 2021 Heilongjiang road crash. A heavy-duty semi-trailer towing a trailer collided with a four-wheel tractor on the G229 in Heilongjiang Province, killing 15 and injuring one.
 October 12 – Nepal – Mugu bus accident. A bus carrying 45 passengers fell into a river, killing 32 people.
 November 3 – Pakistan – Azad Kashmir bus incident. A 40-seater bus heading to Rawalpindi carrying more than 30 passengers fell into a ditch in Pallandri, killing at least 23 people, including women and children, and injuring seven others.
 November 5 – Sierra Leone – Freetown fuel tanker explosion. A collision between a petrol fuel tanker and a lorry at a busy junction of Freetown resulted in an explosion and a fire that left 151 people dead and 304 injured.
 November 7 – Mexico – Highway 150D toll booth disaster. A truck heading for Mexico City crashed through the San Marcos Huixtoco tollbooth and collided with six cars, igniting a fire. 19 people were killed and three injured.
 November 23 – Bulgaria – Bosnek bus crash. A bus carrying North Macedonian tourists crashed and caught fire, killing 45 people and injuring 7.
 November 26 – Mexico – Joquicingo bus crash. A bus crash killed 19 people and injured 20 people.
 December 9 – Mexico – Chiapas truck crash. A truck carrying over 180 smuggled migrants on Mexican Federal Highway 190 overturned and hit the base of a pedestrian bridge. 55 were killed and over 100 injured.
 December 14 – Haiti – Cap-Haïtien fuel tanker explosion. A fuel truck overturned and exploded, killing at least 90 people and injuring more than 120 after locals tried to collect spilled fuel.

2022
 January 7 – Palestine – West Bank bus crash. A truck and minibus collided at Petzal Junction on Highway 90, killing 8 people and injuring 2 others.
 January 12 – Philippines– Balingasag truck crash. At least 11 people were killed after a small truck packed with partygoers, including children, overturned in Balingasag, Misamis Oriental.
 January 20 – Ghana – Bogoso explosion. A truck transporting mining explosives collided with a motorcycle. The resulting explosion levelled the nearby Apiate village, killing 13 people and injuring 200.
 January 29 – United States – North Las Vegas car crash. A collision between a speeding driver in a Dodge Challenger and multiple other vehicles in North Las Vegas, Nevada, resulted in 9 deaths, including 4 children. Alcohol, cocaine, and PCP were found in the offending driver's autopsy.
 February 7 – Indonesia – Bantul bus crash. A tour bus carrying factory workers to a beach holiday crashed while descending a steep hill at Bantul, Yogyakarta, Central Java, killing 13 people and injuring 34.
 March 18 – Tanzania – Melela Kibaoni bus crash. At least 22 people died and 38 injured after a bus crashed into a truck.
 March 20 – Belgium – Strépy-Bracquegnies car crash. A motorist drove through a crowd celebrating Carnival in Strépy-Bracquegnies, La Louvière, killing six people and wounding around 40, 10 seriously.
 March 22 – United States – Tishomingo truck collision. Six teenagers were killed in Tishomingo, Oklahoma when a car was struck by a semi-truck.
 April 5 – Hungary – Mindszent train crash. A train hit a truck on the crossing in Mindszent near the Serbian border shortly before 05:00 GMT. Five people were killed and 10 injured.
 April 13 – Egypt – Luxor bus crash. A tourist bus collided with a truck and burst into flames, killing at least 10 people.
 May 16 – Indonesia – East Java bus crash. A bus carrying tourists crashed into a billboard and flipped on the Surabaya–Mojokerto Toll Road. 14 people were killed and 19 were injured.
 June 6 – India – Uttarakhand bus accident. A bus carrying 55 passengers as a part of a marriage ceremony fell into a 500-metre-deep gorge. 32 people were killed and the rest were heavily injured. 
 July 19 – Egypt – Minya bus crash. At least 23 people were killed and 30 more left injured when a bus traveling down a desert highway slammed into a truck.
 July 24 – Kenya – Tharaka Nithi bus crash. At least 34 people died after a bus fell off a bridge and plunged some 40 metres into the Nithi River.
 August 4 – Philippines– General Santos truck crash. 10 died in a collision involving a ten-wheeler hauler truck, a van fully loaded with passengers, and a Ford Raptor pick-up truck in General Santos.
 August 5 – United States – Windsor Hills car crash. A car sped through an intersection in Windsor Hills, California and crashed into multiple other cars, killing six people and injuring eight.
 August 6 – Croatia – Breznički Hum bus crash. A bus carrying Polish pilgrims to Medjugorje in Bosnia-Herzegovina veered off the A4 between Jarek Bisaški and Podvorec, killing 12 and injuring all other 32 passengers.
 August 16 – Pakistan – M-5 motorway bus-oil tanker collision. A sleeper bus coming from Lahore to Karachi on the M-5 motorway caught fire after a collision with an oil tanker. As a result, both vehicles caught fire and at least 20 people were killed and six injured.
 August 20 – Turkey – Turkey bus crashes. Two separate bus crashes killed 35 people in Gaziantep and Mardin Provinces.
 August 21 – Russia – Ulyanovsk bus crash. At least 16 people died and another three were hospitalized after a truck collided with a stationary minibus.
 August 28 – Canada – Barrie car accident. Six were killed as a vehicle crashed into a concrete pit at a construction zone in Barrie.
 August 31 – Indonesia – West Java road crash. A truck lost its brakes and crashed near a bus stop outside a school, toppling a concrete communications tower and crashing into two motorcycles in Bekasi, West Java, killing 10 and injuring 23.
 September 9 – Nigeria – Lanlate bus collision. More than 20 people were burned to death after a head-to-head bus collision in Lanlate, Ibarapa, Oyo. Only two badly burned people survived.
 September 10 – Mexico – Tamaulipas bus-tanker collision. 20 people burned to death after a bus collided with a double-tanker fuel truck in Tamaulipas.
 September 13 – India – Poonch minibus accident. 12 people were killed and 30 were injured after a minibus fell into a gorge in the Poonch district in Kashmir.
 September 16 – South Africa – Pongola bus collision. 19 people, 16 of which were schoolchildren, were killed after a minibus collided with a truck near Pongola, KwaZulu-Natal.
 September 17 – Costa Rica – Alajuela bus crash. Nine people were killed and at least 30 others were reported missing after a bus crashed in Alajuela Province.
 September 18 – China – Guizhou bus crash. A bus carrying 47 people overturned, killing 27 people and injuring 20.
 October 1 – India – Kanpur road accident. A tractor carrying pilgrims overturned and fell into a pond. 26 people died in the accident, while 9 others were injured
 October 5 – India – Palakkad bus accident. A bus rammed into the back of another bus. 9 people including students were killed and 38 were injured.
 October 15 – Colombia – Nariño bus crash. At least 20 people died and 15 others were injured when a bus overturned on the Pan-American Highway.
 October 25 – Egypt – Dakahlia road collision. A truck slammed into a minibus in the Nile Delta, killing at least 10 people.
 November 12 – Egypt – Dakahlia bus crash. 20 people were killed when the minibus they were traveling in toppled into a canal in the Nile Delta.
 November 22 – Nigeria – Maiduguri bus crash. At least 37 people were killed when two buses collided head-on and burst into flames, followed by a third bus that crashed into them.
 December 12 – Nepal – Chedagad truck crash. A truck carrying passengers from a wedding veered off a mountain highway leaving 12 people dead. There were no survivors.
 December 13 – Nepal – Bethanchowk bus crash. A bus bumped the side wall of a mountainous road leaving 17 people dead and 22 injured.
 December 17 – Afghanistan – Salang Tunnel fire. At least 12 people were killed and 37 people were injured after a fuel tanker caught fire inside the Salang Tunnel.
 December 23 – India – Chatten truck crash. A truck carrying soldiers skidded down a steep slope into a gorge in Sikkim, killing at least 16. Four other soldiers were injured
 December 24 – Spain – Galicia bus crash. A bus crashed into the Lérez river, killing six people and injuring two.
 December 24 – South Africa – Boksburg explosion. A fuel tanker carrying liquefied petroleum gas (LPG) exploded underneath a railway bridge with a death toll of 40 people.
 December 27 – China – Zhengzhou bridge pile-up. A pile-up involved over 200 cars on the Zhengxin Huanghe bridge, killing one and injuring others.
 December 27 – Sudan – Omdurman bus crash. A bus and a dump truck collided with each other, leaving 16 dead and 19 others injured.
 December 31 – Mexico – Nayarit bus crash. 15 people died and 47 were injured after a bus carrying holiday season tourists flipped on a highway.

2023
 January 4NigeriaNabardo bus crash. A minibus and an articulated trailer crashed head on and caught fire in Bauchi State, killing 18.
 January 5Côte d'IvoireYamoussoukro bus collision. A bus carrying mourners to a funeral collided with another bus, killing at least 14 and injuring dozens.
 January 6UgandaNorth Kyoga bus crash. A bus crashed at night in the North Kyoga region, killing at least 16 and injuring 21.
 January 7KenyaLwakhakha bus crash. A bus heading for Nairobi crashed shortly after crossing the Ugandan border, killing at least 21 and injuring 49.
 January 8SenegalKaffrine bus crash. Two buses collided in Gniby, killing 40 and injuring 101.
 January 8ChinaNanchang truck crash. A truck crashed into a funeral procession in Nanchang County, Jiangxi, killing 19 and injuring 20.
 January 14NigeriaOniworo bus crash. A speeding bus lost control and rammed into a stationary truck on an expressway in Ogun State, killing 10.
 January 16SenegalLouga bus crash. A bus collided with a truck, killing 22 and injuring over 20.
 January 20Sri LankaRadella bus collision. A bus carrying students skidded off the road after colliding with a van in Radella, near Nuwara Eliya, killing seven and injuring over 50.
 January 26ChadBatha bus crash. A bus crashed into a broken down truck near Oum Hadjer, killing 20.
 January 28PeruEl Alto bus crash. A bus plunged off a cliff in the El Alto District, killing at least 24.
 January 28United StatesLouisville, New York bus-truck crash. A bus collided with a box truck on NY 37, killing six and injuring three.
 January 29PakistanLasbela bus crash. A bus fell off a bridge into a ravine and burst into flames in Balochistan, killing 41 and injuring three.
 January 29BeninCollines bus crash. A bus crashed into a truck and burst into flames near Dassa-Zoumé, killing 22 and injuring 21.
 January 29NigeriaLagos bus crush. An articulated truck carrying a  container fell onto a minibus in Ojuelegba, Lagos, killing nine.
 February 3PakistanKohat bus crash. A bus collided head-on with a truck in Kohat District, Khyber Pakhtunkhwa, killing 17.
 February 4ChinaHunan pile-up. Nearly 50 vehicles were involved in a crash on a highway in Changsha, Hunan, killing 16 and injuring 66.
 February 5TurkeyAfyonkarahisar bus crash. A bus crashed and overturned in Afyonkarahisar Province, killing eight and injuring 42.
 February 8CanadaLaval daycare attack. A man drove a bus into a daycare in Laval, Quebec, killing two children and injuring six others.
 February 8MalaysiaGenting van crash. A van crashed into a concrete divider on a road whilst going down from the Genting Highlands, killing seven and injuring seven.
 February 14South AfricaLimpopo bus crash. A tour bus collided head-on with an armoured cash-in-transit van on the N1 in Louis Trichardt, Limpopo before the bus tumbled into a river, killing 20 and injuring 68.
 February 14Vietnam. A car collided with a container truck in Quảng Nam, killing 10 and injuring 11.
 February 15PanamaGualaca bus crash. A bus fell off a cliff in Gualaca District, Chiriquí Province, killing 39 and injuring 24.
 February 19PakistanKallar Kahar bus accident. A bus fell into a ravine near Kallar Kahar, killing 15 and injuring 64.
 February 20BelarusBelarus bus crash. A truck carrying sand collided with a bus near Smalyavichy, killing 11 and injuring 10
 February 25PakistanPunjab bus crash. A bus hit a van on a motorway in Rahim Yar Khan, killing 13.
 March 19BangladeshMadaripur bus crash. A speeding bus skidded off the road and tumbled into a  ditch in Madaripur District, killing 19 and injuring 25.

References

Lists of road transport incidents